It was the first edition of the Eurocard Classics.
Boris Becker won the inaugural singles title, defeating Ivan Lendl 6–2, 6–2 in the final.

Seeds

  Ivan Lendl (final)
  Boris Becker (champion)
  Yannick Noah (second round)
  Carl-Uwe Steeb (first round)
  Emilio Sánchez (second round)
  Horst Skoff (quarterfinals)
  Thomas Muster (first round)
  Ronald Agénor (first round)

Draw

Finals

Top half

Bottom half

References
General

Specific

1990 Singles
Singles